Pseudhyperantha is a genus of beetles in the family Buprestidae, containing the following species:

 Pseudhyperantha bloetei Thery, 1935
 Pseudhyperantha jucunda Saunders, 1869
 Pseudhyperantha pinratanai Hattori, 1997
 Pseudhyperantha trifasciata Toyama, 1989

References

Buprestidae genera